Stockholm City was a free daily newspaper published in Sweden.

History and profile
Stockholm City was published from October 2002 to June 2011. The paper was mainly distributed in the Stockholm Metro and was a competitor with the other free newspaper in Stockholm, the Swedish Metro. 

The City quickly became very successful and within half a year it was the third largest daily newspaper in Stockholm. The paper had a circulation of 294,600 copies in weekdays in 2005. It was approximately 601,000 copies in 2006.

Contents/Sections
Nyheter Stockholm (News Stockholm)
Nyheter Sverige (News Sweden)
Nyheter Världen (News World)
Sport (Sports)
Nöje och Livsstil (Entertainment)
Kurs (Share Price)
Trend/Jobb (Trend/Jobs)
Resor (Travels)
Cityshopping (Shopping guide)
Mat och dryck (Food and drink)
Motor
Leva och må bra (Life and Health)
Pryl och Teknik (High Tech)
TV-tablå (TV guide)

References

External links
Official website

2002 establishments in Sweden
2011 disestablishments in Sweden
Newspapers established in 2002
Publications disestablished in 2011
Defunct free daily newspapers
Swedish-language newspapers
Daily newspapers published in Sweden
Newspapers  published in Stockholm